Săndulești is a commune in Cluj County, Transylvania, Romania. It is composed of two villages, Copăceni (Koppánd) and Săndulești.

Demographics 
According to the census from 2002 there was a total population of 1,892 people living in this commune. Of this population, 94.60% are ethnic Romanians, 4.28% are ethnic Hungarians and 1.10% ethnic Romani.

Personalities
 Mihály Bors, a leader in the Unitarian Church of Transylvania

Tourism
 Fishing lake in Săndulești
 Salt Mine in Turda
 Turda Gorges (interesting landscape)

References

Atlasul localităților județului Cluj (Cluj County Localities Atlas), Suncart Publishing House, Cluj-Napoca, 

Communes in Cluj County
Localities in Transylvania